Structural building components are specialized structural building products designed, engineered and manufactured under controlled conditions for a specific application. They are incorporated into the overall building structural system by a building designer. Examples are wood or steel roof trusses, floor trusses, floor panels, I-joists, or engineered beams and headers.

A structural building component manufacturer or truss manufacturer is an individual or company regularly engaged in the manufacturing of components.

Construction
Building materials